Kingston Field Naturalists (KFN) is a community nature organization based in Kingston, Ontario, and a member of Ontario Nature or Federation of Ontario Naturalists. The Club, formed in 1949, serves to stimulate interest in nature and promote the preservation of the natural world. 

The KFN is very active with about 500 members. It owns and manages two nature reserves, the Martin Edwards Reserve on Amherst Island and the Helen Quilliam Sanctuary, near Frontenac Provincial Park. KFN is steward to several other local, protected lands as well. 

In 2008 the Club published its second edition of the Birds of the Kingston Region, 611pp, by Ron D. Weir. This book is a historical reference for conservation of birds and puts bird observations into a local context for amateur birders.

The KFN is always open to new members and the public is free to attend monthly meetings and occasional outdoor nature events. People of all skill levels with an interest in nature make up the membership. There are also junior and teen branches, for ages 6 to 17.

References

External links
 

Environmental organizations based in Ontario
Organizations based in Kingston, Ontario